3α-Hydroxysteroid dehydrogenase (3α-HSD or aldo-keto reductase family 1 member C4) is an enzyme that in humans is encoded by the AKR1C4 gene. It is known to be necessary for the synthesis of the endogenous neurosteroids allopregnanolone, THDOC, and 3α-androstanediol. It is also known to catalyze the reversible conversion of 3α-androstanediol (5α-androstane-3α,17β-diol) to dihydrotestosterone (DHT, 5α-androstan-17β-ol-3-one) and vice versa.

Function 
This gene encodes a member of the aldo/keto reductase superfamily, which consists of more than 40 known enzymes and proteins. These enzymes catalyze the conversion of aldehydes and ketones to their corresponding alcohols by utilizing NADH and/or NADPH as cofactors. The enzymes display overlapping but distinct substrate specificity. This enzyme catalyzes the bioreduction of chlordecone, a toxic organochlorine pesticide, to chlordecone alcohol in liver. This gene shares high sequence identity with three other gene members and is clustered with those three genes at 10p15-p14 on chromosome 10.

Clinical significance 
Various antidepressants, including the SSRIs fluoxetine, fluvoxamine, sertraline, and paroxetine, the SNRI venlafaxine, and mirtazapine, have been found to activate certain 3α-HSD enzymes, resulting in a selective facilitation of 5α-dihydroprogesterone conversion into allopregnanolone. This action has been implicated in their effectiveness in affective disorders, and has resulted in them being described as selective brain steroidogenic stimulants (SBSSs).

See also
 Steroidogenic enzyme
 3α-hydroxysteroid dehydrogenase type 3
 3β-Hydroxysteroid dehydrogenase

References

External links

Further reading 

 
 
 
 
 
 
 
 
 
 
 
 
 

EC 1.1.1